Alden Holmes Miller (February 4, 1906 – October 9, 1965) was an American ornithologist and director of the Museum of Vertebrate Zoology at the University of California, Berkeley for 25 years. He published over 250 papers on the biology, distribution, and taxonomy of birds, and served as president of the American Ornithologists' Union (1953-1955) and the International Commission on Zoological Nomenclature (1964-1965), and as editor of The Condor from 1939 until his death. He was a member of the National Academy of Sciences.

Alden Miller was born February 4, 1906, in Los Angeles, California, the son of Loye H. Miller, a noted professor and researcher. He attended the University of California, Los Angeles, earning a B.A. in 1927, then enrolled in UC Berkeley, receiving an M.S. in 1928 and his PhD in 1930 under Joseph Grinnell. Ten years later he succeeded Grinnell as the director of the Museum of Vertebrate Zoology. He is noted for his studies of Lanius (the largest genus of shrikes) and juncos (sparrow-like birds). He received the Brewster Medal for his contributions to ornithology. Miller's approach to collections-based research employed "concepts, theories, practices, tools, and technologies from the laboratory, museum, and field."

Miller supervised around 30 doctoral students and 15 master's students, many of whom became notable ornithologists in their own right. His doctoral students included Charles G. Sibley, who co-developed the Sibley–Ahlquist taxonomy of birds; author and conservationist A. Starker Leopold; and Richard C. Banks, founder of the Ornithological Council.

Miller died of a heart attack at Clear Lake, California, on October 9, 1965, at the age of 59.


Books
 (With Joseph Grinnell)
 (With Robert C. Stebbins)

Notes

References

External links
Alden H. Miller papers collection guide at the Online Archive of California

1906 births
1965 deaths
American ornithologists
20th-century American zoologists
Directors of museums in the United States
Scientists from Los Angeles
University of California, Berkeley alumni
University of California, Berkeley faculty
University of California, Los Angeles alumni
Members of the United States National Academy of Sciences